Rumex beringensis is a flowering plant species in the family Polygonaceae.

References

beringensis